Thomas Burnett or Burnet may refer to:
 
Thomas Burnet (c. 1635–1715), theologian
Thomas Burnet (physician) (1638–1704), physician to Charles II, James II, William and Mary, and Queen Anne
Sir Thomas Burnett, 1st Baronet (died 1653), feudal baron who represented Kincardineshire in the Scottish Parliament, 1621
Sir Thomas Burnett, 3rd Baronet (after 1656–1714), MP for Scotland, 1707–1708
Thomas Burnet (judge) (1694–1753), English wit, barrister and judge
 Sir Thomas Burnett, 6th Baronet (died 1783), of the Burnett baronets
Sir Thomas Burnett, 8th Baronet (1778–1849), Lord Lieutenant of Kincardine, 1847–1849
Thomas P. Burnett (1800–1846), Michigan and Wisconsin Territorial legislator
Sir Thomas Burnett, 12th Baronet (1840–1926), Lord Lieutenant of Kincardine, 1920–1926
Thomas Burnett (footballer) (1852–?), Wales international footballer
Thomas Stuart Burnett (1853–1888), Scottish sculptor
Thomas Lloyd Burnett (1871–1938), American rancher from Texas
Thomas Burnett (New Zealand politician) (1877–1941), New Zealand politician
Tom Burnett (footballer) (1913–1986), English footballer for Darlington
Thomas Burnett Swann (1928–1976), American poet and author
Tom L. Burnett (born 1954), politician in the Montana House of Representatives
Tom Burnett (1963–2001), passenger aboard United Airlines Flight 93, and victim of the attacks on September 11

See also
Tom Burnette (1915–1994), American football player